N. darwinii may refer to:

Nassauvia darwinii, a flowering plant in the genus Nassauvia
Necterosoma darwinii, a beetle in the genus Necterosoma
Nothura darwinii, a bird, Darwin's nothura

See also
 N. darwini (disambiguation)
 Darwinii (disambiguation)